The COVID-19 pandemic in Cape Verde is part of the worldwide pandemic of coronavirus disease 2019 caused by severe acute respiratory syndrome coronavirus 2. The virus was confirmed to have reached Cape Verde in March 2020.



Background 
On 12 January 2020, the World Health Organization (WHO) confirmed that a novel coronavirus was the cause of a respiratory illness in a cluster of people in Wuhan City, Hubei Province, China, which was reported to the WHO on 31 December 2019.

The case fatality ratio for COVID-19 has been much lower than SARS of 2003, but the transmission has been significantly greater, with a significant total death toll. Model-based simulations for Cape Verde suggest that the 95% confidence interval for the time-varying reproduction number R t has been lower than 1.0 since August 2021.

Timeline

March 2020 
 On 20 March, the first case of COVID-19 in the country was confirmed, being a 62-year-old foreigner from the United Kingdom.
 Two more cases were confirmed the following day on 21 March. Both cases were tourists, one from the Netherlands, aged 60, and one from United Kingdom, aged 62. These two cases and the previous one were all on Boa Vista island before testing positive. The first death was announced on 24 March, regarding the first confirmed case in Cape Verde.
 On 25 March, a fourth case was confirmed, a 43-year-old national citizen who had returned from Europe, being the first case detected in the country's capital, Praia, on Santiago island. On the following day, 26 March, Cape Verde's Health minister announced that the man's wife had also tested positive, thus being the first reported local transmission.
 Of the five confirmed cases in March, by the end of the month one person had died while four remained active cases.

April  to June 2020 
 In April there were 116 new cases, raising the total number of confirmed cases to 121. The death toll remained unchanged and four patients recovered, leaving 116 active cases at the end of the month.
 In May there were 314 new cases, bringing the total number of confirmed cases to 435. The death toll rose to 4. There were 189 recoveries, raising the number of recovered patients to 193 and leaving 238 active cases at the end of the month.
 There were 792 new cases in June, raising the total number of confirmed cases to 1227. The death toll rose to 15. The number of recovered patients increased to 629, leaving 583 active cases at the end of the month.

July to September 2020 
 The number of confirmed cases nearly doubled in July, to 2451. The death toll rose by eight to 23. The number of recovered patients increased to 1824, leaving 604 active cases at the end of the month (4% more than at the end of June).
 There were 1433 new cases in August, raising the total number of confirmed cases to 3884. The death toll rose to 40. At the end of the month there were 928 active cases.
 There were 2016 new cases in September, raising the total number of confirmed cases to 5900. The death toll rose to 59. The number of recovered patients increased to 5228, leaving 613 active cases at the end of the month.

October to December 2020
 There were 2948 new cases in October, bringing the total number of confirmed cases to 8848. The death toll rose to 95. The number of recovered patients increased to 8012, leaving 739 active cases at the end of the month.
 There were 1913 new cases in November, bringing the total number of confirmed cases to 10761. The death toll rose to 105. The number of recovered patients increased to 10329, leaving 327 active cases at the end of the month.
 There were 1032 new cases in December, taking the total number of confirmed cases to 11793. The death toll rose to 112. The number of recovered patients increased to 11530, leaving 151 active cases at the end of the month.

January to March 2021
 There were 2277 new cases in January, taking the total number of confirmed cases to 14070. The death toll rose to 134. The number of recovered patients increased to 13144, leaving 792 active cases at the end of the month.
 There were 1330 new cases in February, taking the total number of confirmed cases to 15400. The death toll rose to 147. The number of recovered patients increased to 14814, leaving 439 active cases at the end of the month.
 Cape Verde's vaccination campaign began on 19 March.
 There were 2070 new cases in March, taking the total number of confirmed cases to 17470. The death toll rose to 168. The number of recovered patients increased to 16277, leaving 1025 active cases at the end of the month.

April to June 2021
 There were 6084 new cases in April, taking the total number of confirmed cases to 23554. The death toll rose to 213. The number of recovered patients increased to 20257, leaving 3084 active cases at the end of the month.
 There were 6805 new cases in May, taking the total number of confirmed cases to 30359. The death toll rose to 264. The number of recovered patients increased to 28428, leaving 1667 active cases at the end of the month.
 There were 2098 new cases in June, taking the total number of confirmed cases to 32457. The death toll rose to 286. The number of recovered patients increased to 31565, leaving 606 active cases at the end of the month.

July to September 2021

 There were 1334 new cases in July, taking the total number of confirmed cases to 33791. The death toll rose to 298. The number of recovered patients increased to 33011, leaving 482 active cases at the end of the month.
 There were 1563 new cases in August, taking the total number of confirmed cases to 35354. The death toll rose to 313. The number of recovered patients increased to 34245, leaving 796 active cases at the end of the month.
 There were 2222 new cases in September, taking the total number of confirmed cases to 37576. The death toll rose to 339. The number of recovered patients increased to 36676, leaving 561 active cases at the end of the month.

October to December 2021
 There were 639 new cases in October, bringing the total number of confirmed cases to 38215. The death toll rose to 349. The number of recovered patients increased to 37708, leaving 158 active cases at the end of the month.
 There were 155 new cases in November, bringing the total number of confirmed cases to 38370. The death toll rose to 350. The number of recovered patients increased to 37952, leaving 68 active cases at the end of the month.
 There were 4093 new cases in December, bringing the total number of confirmed cases to 42463. The death toll rose to 352. The number of recovered patients increased to 38312, leaving 3773 active cases at the end of the month. Modelling by WHO's Regional Office for Africa suggests that due to under-reporting, the true number of infections by the end of 2021 was around 0.3 million while the true number of COVID-19 deaths was around 383.

January to March 2022
 There were 13232 new cases in January, raising the total number of confirmed cases to 55695. The death toll rose to 396. The number of recovered patients increased to 54761, leaving 490 active cases at the end of the month.
 There were 192 new cases in February, bringing the total number of confirmed cases to 55887. The death toll rose to 401. The number of recovered patients increased to 55415, leaving 19 active cases at the end of the month.
 There were 70 new cases in March, bringing the total number of confirmed cases to 55957. The death toll remained unchanged. The number of recovered patients increased to 55493, leaving 11 active cases at the end of the month.

April to June 2022
 There were 68 new cases in April, bringing the total number of confirmed cases to 56025. The death toll remained unchanged. The number of recovered patients increased to 55556, leaving 68 active cases at the end of the month.
 There were 269 new cases in May, bringing the total number of confirmed cases to 56294. The death toll rose to 402.
 There were 4248 new cases in June, bringing the total number of confirmed cases to 60542. The death toll rose to 405.

July to September 2022
 There were 1617 new cases in July, bringing the total number of confirmed cases to 62159. The death toll rose to 410. The number of recovered patients increased to 61611, leaving 138 active cases at the end of the month.
 There were 169 new cases in August, bringing the total number of confirmed cases to 62328. The death toll remained unchanged. The number of recovered patients increased to 61843, leaving 75 active cases at the end of the month.
 There were 46 new cases in September, bringing the total number of confirmed cases to 62374. The death toll remained unchanged. The number of recovered patients increased to 61890, leaving 19 active cases at the end of the month.

October to December 2022
 Samples taken between May and October showed that the rapidly spreading BA.5.2.1.7 variant was present in Cape Verde.
 There were 25 new cases in October, bringing the total number of confirmed cases to 62397. The death toll remained unchanged. The number of recovered patients increased to 61923, leaving 64 active cases at the end of the month.
 There were 654 new cases in November, bringing the total number of confirmed cases to 63051. The death toll rose to 412. The number of recovered patients increased to 62473, leaving 111 active cases at the end of the month.
 There were 152 new cases in December, bringing the total number of confirmed cases to 63203. The death toll remained unchanged. The number of recovered patients increased to 62733, leaving three active cases at the end of the month.

January to December 2023
 There were 26 new cases in January and 12 new cases in February. The total number of cases stood at 63229 in January and 63241 in February.
 The number of recovered patients increased to 62770 in February, leaving 58 active cases at the end of the month.
 The death toll rose to 413 in January.

Statistics

Confirmed new cases per day

Confirmed deaths per day

Prevention
Since 16 March tests are being made in Cape Verde rather than abroad, by the Laboratório de Virologia de Cabo Verde, in Praia.

On 17 March, as a contingency measure, Prime Minister José Ulisses Correia e Silva announced a three-week suspension of all incoming flights from the US, Brazil, Senegal, Nigeria, Portugal, and all European countries affected by the coronavirus. Exceptions were made for cargo flights and flights for foreign citizens wishing to return home. The ban also applies to the docking of cruise ships, sailing ships and landing from passengers or crew from cargo ships or fishing ships. More exceptional measures were taken the day after, and the contingency level was raised on 27 March.

Cabo Verde Airlines had already taken the decision to suspend flights. Since 28 February the flights to Milan (Italy) are suspended. On 6 March, the flights to Lagos (Nigeria), Porto Alegre (Brazil) and Washington D.C. (United States) were also suspended. On 17 March, per to the Government's decision, Cabo Verde Airlines suspended all of its routes.

On March 28, for the first time in its history, a state of emergency was declared in Cape Verde, implementing a set of measures.

See also 
 COVID-19 pandemic in Africa
 COVID-19 pandemic by country and territory
 COVID-19 vaccination in Cape Verde

References

External links 

 Instituto Nacional de Saúde Pública - Cape Verde's Public Health National Institute
 COVID 19 — Corona Vírus - Official site about COVID-19 in Cape Verde
 Africa Centres for Disease Control and Prevention (CDC) Dashboard on Covid-19 
 COVID-19 Africa Open Data Project Dashboard
 West African Health Organization COVID-19 Dashboard
 WHO COVID-19 Dashboard